Anne Sofie Berge (born 16 July 1937) is a Norwegian politician for the Christian Democratic Party.

She served as a deputy representative to the Norwegian Parliament from Rogaland during the term 1997–2001. In total she met during 6 days of parliamentary session.

References

1937 births
Living people
Christian Democratic Party (Norway) politicians
Deputy members of the Storting
Rogaland politicians
Place of birth missing (living people)
20th-century Norwegian women politicians
20th-century Norwegian politicians
Women members of the Storting